Diaphania latilimbalis is a moth in the family Crambidae. It was described by Achille Guenée in 1854. It is found in Mexico, Guatemala, Honduras, Venezuela and Brazil. The habitat consists of tropical rainforests and cloud forests.

The length of the forewings is 13–16 mm for males and 13.6–17 mm for females. The forewings are dark brown with a light purple gloss.

References

Diaphania
Moths described in 1854
Moths of North America
Moths of South America
Taxa named by Achille Guenée